Tadeu Antônio Ferreira (born 4 February 1992), simply known as Tadeus, is a Brazilian footballer who plays for Goiás as a goalkeeper.

Club career
Born in Joaquim Távora, Paraná, Tadeu was a Coritiba youth graduate, after joining the club at the age of 15. In February 2013, he was loaned to Tupi, and made his senior debut on 3 March by starting in a 1–1 Campeonato Mineiro home draw against América Mineiro.

Tadeu subsequently represented Junior Team and Maringá on loan before leaving Coxa in 2015, after his contract expired. On 7 January 2016, he agreed to a one-year deal with Ceará, but left the club in July after making no official appearances, and subsequently joined Ferroviária.

On 24 March 2018, Tadeu scored his first senior goal by netting his team's third through a penalty kick in a 3–1 home defeat of Red Bull Brasil for the Campeonato Paulista championship; by doing so, he became the first goalkeeper to score a goal for Ferroviária in the club's history. On 6 April, he agreed to a loan deal with Série B side Oeste until the end of the year, where he became an immediate first-choice.

Returning to AFE for the 2019 campaign, Tadeu was again a regular starter for the club before joining Goiás of the Série A on 4 April 2019, on loan until December. He made his top tier debut on 28 April, starting in a 1–0 away defeat of Fluminense.

In December 2019, after being an undisputed starter for Goiás, Tadeu signed a permanent four-year contract with the club.

Career statistics

Honours
Ferroviária
Copa Paulista: 2017

References

External links
Goiás EC profile 

1992 births
Living people
Sportspeople from Paraná (state)
Brazilian footballers
Association football goalkeepers
Campeonato Brasileiro Série A players
Campeonato Brasileiro Série B players
Coritiba Foot Ball Club players
Tupi Football Club players
Maringá Futebol Clube players
Ceará Sporting Club players
Associação Ferroviária de Esportes players
Oeste Futebol Clube players
Goiás Esporte Clube players